Megachile aurifrons is a species of bee in the family Megachilidae. It was described by Frederick Smith in 1853.

An Australian native bee that is larger than the usual native bee, the Megachile aurifrons female bee measures about 12 mm in length, whilst the male is smaller at about 10 mm in length. It is the female bee that has the distinctive red eyes, whilst the male have eyes that are more milky coloured with red tint. Both male and female of the species have the “golden brow” on their faces, hence their common name of the ‘Golden-browed Resin Bee’. The ‘resin’ part of the name alludes to the resin they make to cap their nesting holes.

References

Aurifrons
Insects described in 1853